The year 2000 in film involved some significant events.
The top grosser worldwide was Mission: Impossible 2. Domestically in North America, Gladiator won the Academy Awards for Best Picture and Best Actor (Russell Crowe). Dinosaur was the most expensive film of 2000 and a box-office success.



Overview
2000 saw the releases of the first installment of popular film series X-Men, Final Destination, Scary Movie, and Meet the Parents.

Among the films based on TV shows are Mission: Impossible 2, Traffic, The Adventures of Rocky and Bullwinkle, Charlie's Angels and Rugrats in Paris: The Movie

Among the movies based on books (and TV shows) is Thomas and the Magic Railroad.

The most acclaimed films of the year are Gladiator; Traffic; Crouching Tiger, Hidden Dragon; American Psycho; Almost Famous, Requiem for a Dream, and Erin Brockovich.

Highest-grossing films

The top 10 films released in 2000 by worldwide gross are as follows:

2000 box office records 
 Chicken Run became the highest-grossing stop motion animated film ever.
 Dr. Seuss' How the Grinch Stole Christmass $55.1 million opening weekend became the highest debut for a Christmas-themed film. It had the highest opening weekend for a Jim Carrey film and a Ron Howard film, surpassing both Batman Forever and Ransom simultaneously.

Events

Award ceremonies

Awards

2000 Wide-release films

January–March

April–June

July–September

October–December

Films released in 2000

#
 101 Reykjavík, directed by Baltasar Kormákur, starring Victoria Abril, Hilmir Snær Guðnason, and Hanna María Karlsdóttir
 102 Dalmatians, directed by Kevin Lima, starring Glenn Close, Ioan Gruffudd, Alice Evans, Tim McInnerny, and Gérard Depardieu
 28 Days, directed by Betty Thomas, starring Sandra Bullock, Viggo Mortensen, Dominic West, Elizabeth Perkins, Steve Buscemi, and Diane Ladd.
 The 6th Day, directed by Roger Spottiswoode, starring Arnold Schwarzenegger, Michael Rapaport, Tony Goldwyn, Michael Rooker, Sarah Wynter, and Robert Duvall

A
 Across the Line, directed by Martin Spottl, starring Brad Johnson, Sigal Erez, Brian Bloom, Adrienne Barbeau, and J. C. Quinn
 Adanggaman, directed by Roger Gnoan M'Bala, starring Rasmané Ouédraogo
 Adventures in Wild California, documentary film, directed by Greg MacGillivray, narrated by Jimmy Smits
 The Adventures of Rocky and Bullwinkle, directed by Des McAnuff, starring June Foray, Keith Scott, Rene Russo, Jason Alexander, Randy Quaid, Kel Mitchell, Kenan Thompson, Piper Perabo, and Robert De Niro
 Ali Zaoua, directed by Nabil Ayouch, starring Saïd Taghmaoui
 All the Pretty Horses, directed by Billy Bob Thornton, starring Matt Damon and Penélope Cruz
 Almost Famous, directed by Cameron Crowe, starring Billy Crudup, Kate Hudson, Patrick Fugit, Anna Paquin, Philip Seymour Hoffman and Frances McDormand
 American Psycho, directed by Mary Harron, starring Christian Bale, Reese Witherspoon, Jared Leto and Willem Dafoe
 Amores perros (Love's a Bitch), directed by Alejandro González Iñárritu, starring Emilio Echevarría, Gael García Bernal and Adriana Barraza
 Animal Factory, directed by Steve Buscemi, starring Willem Dafoe, Edward Furlong, Tom Arnold and Mickey Rourke
 The Art of War, directed by Christian Duguay, starring Wesley Snipes, Anne Archer, Maury Chaykin, Marie Matiko, Cary-Hiroyuki Tagawa, Michael Biehn, and Donald Sutherland
 Autumn in New York, directed by Joan Chen, starring Richard Gere, and Winona Ryder

B
 Baise-moi, directed by Virginie Despentes and Coralie Trinh Thi, starring Karen Lancaume, and Raffaëla Anderson
 Bait, directed by Antoine Fuqua, starring Jamie Foxx, David Morse, Doug Hutchinson, Kimberly Elise, David Paymer, Mike Epps, Robert Pastorelli, and Jamie Kennedy
 Baller Blockin', directed by Steven Esteb, starring B.G., Birdman, Jeanette Branch, Juvenile, Jerry Katz, Terence Rosemore, Mykel Shannon Jenkins, Turk, Shawanna Washington, and Lil Wayne.
 Bang Rajan, directed by Tanit Jitnukul, starring Winai Kraibutr, Jaran Ngamdee, and Bongkoj Khongmalai. The highest-grossing film in Thai film history
 Battle Royale, directed by Kinji Fukasaku, starring Takeshi Kitano
 Battlefield Earth, directed by Roger Christian, starring John Travolta, Barry Pepper, Forest Whitaker, Kim Coates, Richard Tyson, and Sabine Karsenti. Winner of 9 Golden Raspberry Awards including worst film of the decade (awarded in 2010).
 The Beach, directed by Danny Boyle and starring Leonardo DiCaprio, Tilda Swinton and Robert Carlyle
 Beautiful, directed by Sally Field, starring Minnie Driver, Joey Lauren Adams and Kathleen Turner
 Bedazzled, directed by Harold Ramis, starring Brendan Fraser, Elizabeth Hurley and Frances O'Connor
 Before Night Falls, directed by Julian Schnabel, starring Javier Bardem, Johnny Depp and Sean Bean
 The Bench (Bænken), directed by Per Fly, starring Jesper Christensen
 Best in Show, directed by and starring Christopher Guest, with Catherine O'Hara, Eugene Levy, Fred Willard, Jane Lynch and Parker Posey
 A Better Way to Die, directed by Scott Wiper, starring Andre Braugher, Scott Wiper, Jack Conley, and Carmen Argenziano
 Big Momma's House, directed by Raja Gosnell, starring Martin Lawrence, Nia Long, Terrence Howard and Paul Giamatti
 Billy Elliot, directed by Stephen Daldry and starring Jamie Bell and Julie Walters
 Bless the Child, directed by Chuck Russell, starring Kim Basinger, Jimmy Smits, Angela Bettis, Rufus Sewell, Christina Ricci, and Holliston Coleman
 Blue's Big Musical Movie, directed by Todd Kessler, starring Steven Burns, Traci Paige Johnson, and Ray Charles
 Boiler Room, starring Vin Diesel and Giovanni Ribisi
 Book of Shadows: Blair Witch 2, directed by Joe Berlinger
 Bootmen, starring Adam Garcia and Sam Worthington
 Bounce, starring Ben Affleck and Gwyneth Paltrow
 Boys and Girls
 Bring it On, directed by Peyton Reed, starring Kirsten Dunst, Gabrielle Union and Eliza Dushku
 The Broken Hearts Club: A Romantic Comedy, starring Timothy Olyphant, Zach Braff, John Mahoney, Nia Long and Mary McCormack
 Brother, directed by Takeshi Kitano

C
 La Captive, directed by Chantal Akerman
 Cast Away, directed by Robert Zemeckis, starring Tom Hanks and Helen Hunt
 Cecil B. Demented, directed by John Waters, starring Melanie Griffith and Stephen Dorff
 The Cell, directed by Tarsem Singh, starring Jennifer Lopez and Vince Vaughn
 Center Stage
 The Chaos Factor, starring Antonio Sabàto Jr., Fred Ward, Kelly Rutherford, R. Lee Ermey
 Charlie's Angels, directed by McG starring Cameron Diaz, Drew Barrymore, Lucy Liu and Bill Murray
 Chicken Run, directed by Peter Lord and Nick Park with the voices of Mel Gibson, Julia Sawalha, Timothy Spall and Miranda Richardson
 Chocolat, directed by Lasse Hallström, starring Juliette Binoche, Johnny Depp, Alfred Molina and Judi Dench
 Chopper, starring Eric Bana
 A Chronicle of Corpses, directed by Andrew Repasky McElhinney, starring Marj Dusay, Oliver Wyman, Margot White, Ryan Foley, Kevin Mitchell Martin, David Semonin, (USA)
 The Circle (دایره), directed by Jafar Panahi
 Circus, starring John Hannah, Famke Janssen, Fred Ward, Peter Stormare, Tiny Lister, Amanda Donohoe, Eddie Izzard
 The Claim, directed by Michael Winterbottom, starring Wes Bentley, Milla Jovovich, Sarah Polley, Peter Mullan and Nastassja Kinski
 Code Unknown, directed by Michael Haneke, starring Juliette Binoche
 Coming Out
 La comunidad, starring Carmen Maura
 The Contender, starring Jeff Bridges, Joan Allen, Gary Oldman and Christian Slater
 Coyote Ugly, starring Piper Perabo, Maria Bello, Tyra Banks and John Goodman
 The Crew, starring Burt Reynolds, Seymour Cassel, Richard Dreyfuss, Dan Hedaya, Carrie-Anne Moss, Jeremy Piven and Jennifer Tilly
 Crouching Tiger, Hidden Dragon directed by Ang Lee, starring Chow Yun-fat, Michelle Yeoh and Zhang Ziyi
 The Crow: Salvation, starring Kirsten Dunst, Eric Mabius, Fred Ward

D
 Dancer in the Dark, directed by Lars von Trier, starring Björk, Peter Stormare and David Morse
 The Day I Became a Woman
 Devils on the Doorstep (鬼子來了), directed by Jiang Wen
 Digimon: The Movie
 Dinosaur, directed by Ralph Zondag and Eric Leighton with the voices of D. B. Sweeney, Alfre Woodard, Ossie Davis and Samuel E. Wright
 Ditto
 Divided We Fall (Musíme si pomáhat)
 Djomeh
 Down to You, starring Freddie Prinze Jr. and Julia Stiles
 Dr. T & the Women, directed by Robert Altman, starring Richard Gere, Helen Hunt, Farrah Fawcett, Laura Dern, Kate Hudson and Liv Tyler
 Dracula 2000, starring Gerard Butler and Christopher Plummer
 Dude, Where's My Car?, starring Ashton Kutcher, Seann William Scott and Jennifer Garner
 Duets, directed by Bruce Paltrow, starring Gwyneth Paltrow, Maria Bello, Paul Giamatti and Huey Lewis
 Dungeons & Dragons, starring Jeremy Irons, Thora Birch and Marlon Wayans
 Durian Durian (榴槤飄飄), directed by Fruit Chan

E–F
 El Bola (Pellet)
 The Emperor's New Groove, directed by Mark Dindal with the voices of David Spade and John Goodman
 Enslavement: The True Story of Fanny Kemble
 Erin Brockovich, directed by Steven Soderbergh, starring Julia Roberts, Aaron Eckhart and Albert Finney
 Escaflowne: The Movie
 VeggieTales: Esther, the Girl Who Would Be Queen
 An Everlasting Piece, directed by Barry Levinson, starring Barry McEvoy and Billy Connolly
 Faat Kiné, directed by Ousmane Sembène
 Face (顔)
 The Family Man, directed by Brett Ratner, starring Nicolas Cage, Téa Leoni and Don Cheadle
 Final Destination, directed by James Wong, starring Devon Sawa, Ali Larter and Seann William Scott
 Finding Forrester, directed by Gus Van Sant and starring Sean Connery, Rob Brown, Anna Paquin and F. Murray Abraham
 For All Time
 For Love or Country: The Arturo Sandoval Story, starring Andy García
 Forbidden Fruit
 The Foul King (반칙왕), directed by Kim Jee-woon
 Frequency, starring Dennis Quaid

G
 Gangster No. 1, starring Malcolm McDowell, Paul Bettany and David Thewlis
 Get Carter, directed by Stephen Kay, starring Sylvester Stallone, Miranda Richardson, Mickey Rourke and Michael Caine
 The Gift, directed by Sam Raimi, starring Cate Blanchett, Giovanni Ribisi, Hilary Swank, Greg Kinnear and Keanu Reeves
 Ginger Snaps
 The Girl
 Girlfight, starring Michelle Rodriguez
 Gladiator, directed by Ridley Scott, starring Russell Crowe, Joaquin Phoenix, Richard Harris and Oliver Reed
 Godzilla vs. Megaguirus
 Golden Bowl, The
 Gone in 60 Seconds, directed by Dominic Sena, starring Nicolas Cage, Christopher Eccleston, Robert Duvall and Angelina Jolie
 Gossip, starring James Marsden
 Greenfingers, starring Clive Owen and Helen Mirren
 Gun Shy, starring Liam Neeson

H
 Hanging Up, starring Diane Keaton and Meg Ryan
 Happy Accidents
 Happy Times
 Help! I'm a Fish
 Here on Earth, starring Chris Klein and Josh Hartnett
 High Fidelity, directed by Stephen Frears, starring John Cusack, Iben Hjejle, Catherine Zeta-Jones, Lisa Bonet Joan Cusack and Jack Black
 Highlander: Endgame, starring Adrian Paul and Christopher Lambert
 Hollow Man, directed by Paul Verhoeven, starring Kevin Bacon, Elisabeth Shue, and Josh Brolin
 The House of Mirth, directed by Terence Davies, starring Gillian Anderson, Eric Stoltz, Laura Linney and Dan Aykroyd
 How the Grinch Stole Christmas, directed by Ron Howard, starring Jim Carrey, Jeffrey Tambor, Christine Baranski, Molly Shannon and Taylor Momsen
 How to Kill Your Neighbor's Dog, starring Kenneth Branagh and Robin Wright

I-K
 Il Mare
 In the Mood for Love, directed by Wong Kar-wai, starring Maggie Cheung and Tony Leung
 The Irrefutable Truth about Demons
 The Isle
 Italian for Beginners, directed by Lone Scherfig
 Ivans Xtc, directed by Bernard Rose, starring Danny Huston and Peter Weller
 Joint Security Area (Gongdong gyeongbi guyeok), directed by Park Chan-wook
 Keeping the Faith, directed by and starring Edward Norton, with Ben Stiller and Jenna Elfman
 The Kid, starring Bruce Willis, Lily Tomlin and Spencer Breslin
 King George and the Ducky
 Kiss Kiss (Bang Bang), starring Stellan Skarsgård and Chris Penn

L
 The Last Producer, directed by and starring Burt Reynolds, with Rod Steiger and Ann-Margret
 The Legend of Bagger Vance, directed by Robert Redford, starring Will Smith, Matt Damon, Charlize Theron and Jack Lemmon
 Little Nicky, directed by Steven Brill, starring Adam Sandler, Rhys Ifans, Harvey Keitel, Patricia Arquette and Rodney Dangerfield
 The Little Vampire, starring Jonathan Lipnicki and Richard E. Grant
 Loser, directed by Amy Heckerling, starring Jason Biggs, Mena Suvari, Dan Aykroyd and Greg Kinnear
 Love's Labour's Lost, directed by and starring Kenneth Branagh, with Alicia Silverstone, Emily Mortimer, Natascha McElhone and Nathan Lane
 Love & Basketball, starring Omar Epps

M
 Maryam
 Me, Myself & Irene, directed by the Farrelly brothers, starring Jim Carrey and Renée Zellweger
 Meet the Parents, directed by Jay Roach, starring Robert De Niro, Ben Stiller, Blythe Danner and Owen Wilson
 Memento, directed by Christopher Nolan, starring Guy Pearce, Carrie-Anne Moss and Joe Pantoliano
 Men of Honor, starring Robert De Niro and Cuba Gooding Jr.
 Mercy Streets, starring Eric Roberts
 The Million Dollar Hotel, directed by Wim Wenders, starring Jeremy Davies, Milla Jovovich, and Mel Gibson
 Miss Congeniality, starring Sandra Bullock, Michael Caine and William Shatner
 Mission: Impossible 2, directed by John Woo, starring Tom Cruise, Dougray Scott, Thandie Newton and Anthony Hopkins
 Mission to Mars, directed Brian De Palma, starring Tim Robbins, Don Cheadle and Gary Sinise
 Mr. Accident
 My Dog Skip, starring Diane Lane and Kevin Bacon

N–O
 The New Country
 The Next Best Thing, directed by John Schlesinger, starring Madonna, Rupert Everett and Neil Patrick Harris
 Next Friday, starring Ice Cube
 No Quarto da Vanda (Portugal)
 Nothin' 2 Lose
 Nurse Betty, directed by Neil LaBute, starring Renée Zellweger, Morgan Freeman, Chris Rock and Greg Kinnear
 Nutty Professor II: The Klumps, starring Eddie Murphy and Janet Jackson
 O Brother, Where Art Thou?, directed by Joel and Ethan Coen, starring George Clooney, Holly Hunter, John Turturro, Tim Blake Nelson and John Goodman
 The Original Kings of Comedy, documentary directed by Spike Lee, starring Steve Harvey, D. L. Hughley, Cedric the Entertainer, and Bernie Mac
 Our Song, starring Kerry Washington

P–Q
 Panic, starring William H. Macy
 The Patriot, directed by Roland Emmerich, starring Mel Gibson and Heath Ledger
 Pay It Forward, directed by Mimi Leder, starring Kevin Spacey, Helen Hunt and Haley Joel Osment
 Peppermint Candy, directed by Lee Chang-dong
 The Perfect Storm, directed by Wolfgang Petersen, starring George Clooney, John C. Reilly, Diane Lane and Mark Wahlberg
 Pitch Black, directed by David Twohy, starring Vin Diesel, Radha Mitchell and Keith David
 Pokémon: The Movie 2000
 Pollock, directed by and starring Ed Harris, with Marcia Gay Harden, Jennifer Connelly and Val Kilmer
 The Price of Milk, starring Karl Urban
 Prince of Central Park, starring Kathleen Turner
 Princes et princesses
 Proof of Life, directed by Taylor Hackford, starring Russell Crowe and Meg Ryan
 Psycho Beach Party, starring Lauren Ambrose
 Purely Belter, directed by Mark Herman
 Quills, directed by Philip Kaufman, starring Geoffrey Rush, Kate Winslet, Michael Caine and Joaquin Phoenix

R
 Ready to Rumble, starring David Arquette
 Red Planet, starring Val Kilmer and Carrie-Anne Moss
 Relative Values, starring Julie Andrews and Colin Firth
 Remember the Titans, starring Denzel Washington
 The Replacements, starring Keanu Reeves and Gene Hackman
 Requiem for a Dream, directed by Darren Aronofsky, starring Jennifer Connelly, Jared Leto, Marlon Wayans, Christopher McDonald and Ellen Burstyn
 Return to Me, starring David Duchovny and Minnie Driver
 The Road to El Dorado, directed by Bibo Bergeron and Don Paul with the voices of Kenneth Branagh and Kevin Kline
 Road Trip, directed by Todd Phillips, starring Breckin Meyer, Amy Smart, Tom Green, Fred Ward and Seann William Scott
 Le Roi Danse (The King is Dancing)
 Romeo Must Die, starring Jet Li and Aaliyah
 Rugrats in Paris: The Movie
 Rules of Engagement, directed by William Friedkin, starring Tommy Lee Jones, Samuel L. Jackson, Guy Pearce and Ben Kingsley

S
 Sade
 Scary Movie, directed by Keenen Ivory Wayans, starring Anna Faris, Regina Hall, Marlon Wayans and Shawn Wayans
 Scream 3, directed by Wes Craven, starring Neve Campbell, David Arquette, Patrick Dempsey and Courteney Cox
 Seventeen Again, starring Tia Mowry and Tamera Mowry
 Sexy Beast, directed by Jonathan Glazer, starring Ray Winstone, Ian McShane and Ben Kingsley
 Shadow of the Vampire, starring John Malkovich, Willem Dafoe and Eddie Izzard
 Shaft, directed by John Singleton, starring Samuel L. Jackson, Christian Bale, Jeffrey Wright and Richard Roundtree
 Shanghai Noon, starring Jackie Chan and Owen Wilson
 The Skulls
 Small Time Crooks, directed by and starring Woody Allen, co-starring Tracey Ullman, Jon Lovitz and Hugh Grant
 The Smokers
 Snatch, directed by Guy Ritchie, starring Brad Pitt, Benicio del Toro, Jason Statham and Dennis Farina
 Some Voices
 Songcatcher, starring Janet McTeer
 Souls Protest
 Space Cowboys, directed by and starring Clint Eastwood, with Tommy Lee Jones, Donald Sutherland and James Garner
 The Specials, starring Thomas Haden Church and Rob Lowe
 Subconscious Cruelty
 Supernova, directed by Walter Hill, starring James Spader and Angela Bassett

T
 The Tao of Steve, starring Donal Logue
 Terror Tract
 Thirteen Days, starring Kevin Costner and Bruce Greenwood (as John F. Kennedy)
 Thomas and the Magic Railroad, directed by Britt Allcroft, starring Alec Baldwin, Peter Fonda, Didi Conn, Mara Wilson and Thomas the Tank Engine
 The Three Stooges
 Tigerland, directed by Joel Schumacher, starring Colin Farrell
 The Tigger Movie
 Timbrels and Torahs
 Time of Favor
 Timecode, directed by Mike Figgis, Salma Hayek, Stellan Skarsgård, Jeanne Tripplehorn, Kyle MacLachlan, Saffron Burrows and Holly Hunter
 Titan A.E., directed by Don Bluth and Gary Goldman with the voices of Matt Damon, Drew Barrymore, Nathan Lane and Bill Pullman
 Traffic, directed by Steven Soderbergh, starring Michael Douglas, Catherine Zeta-Jones, Don Cheadle, Dennis Quaid and Benicio del Toro – Winner of 4 Academy Awards & 2 Golden Globes
 Tripfall
 Turn It Up

U–V
 U-571, directed by Jonathan Mostow, starring Matthew McConaughey, Bill Paxton, Jon Bon Jovi and Harvey Keitel
 Unbreakable, directed by M. Night Shyamalan, starring Bruce Willis, Samuel L. Jackson, and Robin Wright
 Up at the Villa, starring Kristin Scott Thomas, Anne Bancroft and Sean Penn
 Urban Legends: Final Cut
 Vatel, directed by Roland Joffé, starring Gérard Depardieu, Uma Thurman and Tim Roth
 Vertical Limit, directed by Martin Campbell, starring Chris O'Donnell, Bill Paxton and Robin Tunney
 The Visit

W
 The Watcher, starring James Spader and Keanu Reeves
 The Way of the Gun, directed by Christopher McQuarrie, starring Ryan Phillippe, Benicio del Toro, Juliette Lewis, Taye Diggs, Nicky Katt, and James Caan
 waydowntown
 What Lies Beneath, directed by Robert Zemeckis, starring Michelle Pfeiffer and Harrison Ford
 What Planet Are You From?, directed by Mike Nichols, starring Garry Shandling, Annette Bening, John Goodman, Greg Kinnear, Linda Fiorentino and Ben Kingsley
 What Women Want, directed by Nancy Meyers, starring Mel Gibson, Helen Hunt, Marisa Tomei and Alan Alda
 Whipped, starring Amanda Peet
 The Whole Nine Yards, directed by Jonathan Lynn, starring Bruce Willis, Matthew Perry, Amanda Peet and Michael Clarke Duncan
 Wonder Boys, directed by Curtis Hanson, starring Michael Douglas, Tobey Maguire, Frances McDormand, Katie Holmes and Robert Downey Jr.

X–Z
 X-Men, directed by Bryan Singer, starring Hugh Jackman, Halle Berry, Patrick Stewart, Famke Janssen, Anna Paquin and Ian McKellen
 Yi Yi, directed by Edward Yang

Births
 January 7 - Marcus Scribner, American actor
 January 8 - Noah Cyrus, American actress and singer
 January 17 - Chani, South Korean actor
 February 5
Esmé Creed-Miles, English actress
Jordan Nagai, American former child voice actor
 February 10 - Yara Shahidi, American actress
 February 23 - Christian Martyn, Canadian actor
 February 25
Tucker Albrizzi, American actor
Laura Ann Kesling, American actress
 February 27 - Tsuyoshi Furukawa, Japanese singer and actor
 March 6 - Jacob Bertrand, American actor
 March 21 - Jace Norman, American actor
 March 27
Halle Bailey, American actress
Sophie Nélisse, Canadian actress
 April 9 - Jackie Evancho, American singer and actress
 April 11
Milly Alcock, Australian actress
Morgan Lily, American actress and model
 May 7 - Maxwell Perry Cotton, American actor
 May 30 - Jared S. Gilmore, American actor
 June 1 - Willow Shields, American actress
 June 23 - Kim Hyunsoo, South Korean actress
 July 13 - Lucas Lynggaard Tønnesen, Danish actor
 July 14 - Maia Reficco, American actress and singer
 July 16 - Jonathan Morgan Heit, American actor
 July 23 - Malte Gårdinger, Swedish actor
 July 26 - Thomasin McKenzie, New Zealand actress
 July 31 - Kim Sae-ron, South Korean actress
 August 3 - Landry Bender, American actress
 August 24 - Griffin Gluck, American actor
 August 29 - Minami Hamabe, Japanese actress
 September 3 - Ashley Boettcher, American actress
 September 28 - Frankie Jonas, American actor
 October 8 - Isobelle Molloy, English actress
 October 14 - Mekai Curtis, American actor
 October 31 - Willow Smith, American singer and actress
 November 8 - Jade Pettyjohn, American actress
 November 10 - Mackenzie Foy, American model and actress
 November 18 - Arabella Morton, Australian actress
 November 22 - Auliʻi Cravalho, American actress and singer
 November 28 - Jackson Yee, Chinese actor and singer
 December 19 - Yuumi Kawai, Japanese actress

Deaths

Film debuts
 Aaliyah - Romeo Must Die
 Malin Åkerman - The Skulls
 Jamie Bell - Billy Elliot
 Alex Borstein - Coyote Ugly
 John Cena - Ready to Rumble
 Michael Cera - Frequency
 Sacha Baron Cohen - The Jolly Boys' Last Stand
 Adam "Edge" Copeland - Highlander: Endgame
 Terry Crews - The 6th Day
 Paul Dano - The Newcomers
 Chris Evans - The Newcomers
 Jimmy Fallon - Almost Famous
 Isla Fisher - Out of Depth
 Scott Foley - Scream 3
 Topher Grace - Traffic
 Jon Hamm - Space Cowboys
 Gale Harold - 36K
 Cody Linley - My Dog Skip
 Mo'Nique - 3 Strikes
 Rachel Nichols - Autumn in New York
 Josh Peck - Snow Day
 Busy Philipps - The Smokers
 Chris Pratt - Cursed Part 3
 Michelle Rodriguez - Girlfight
 Zoe Saldana - Center Stage
 Kristen Stewart - The Flintstones in Viva Rock Vegas
 Eric Stonestreet - Almost Famous
 Amber Valletta - Drop Back Ten
 Daniella Van Graas - Autumn in New York
 Makenzie Vega - The Family Man
 David Wain - Keeping the Faith
 Kerry Washington - Our Song
 Sam Worthington - Bootmen

See also
 List of 2000 box office number-one films in the United States

References

External links 
 2000 Domestic Grosses at Box Office Mojo
 2000 Worldwide Grosses at Box Office Mojo
 Top 2000 Movies at the Domestic Box Office at The Numbers
 Top 2000 Movies at the International Box Office at The Numbers
 Top 2000 Movies at the Worldwide Box Office at The Numbers
 Top-US-Grossing Titles Released 2000-01-01 to 2000-12-31 at IMDb
 Most Popular Feature Films Released 2000-01-01 to 2000-12-31 at IMDb

 
Film by year